Robert Keith Humphreys (born March 30, 1940), better known as Bob Humphreys, is a former American football placekicker who played two seasons with the Denver Broncos of the American Football League. He first enrolled at Long Beach City College before transferring to the Wichita State University. He attended David Starr Jordan High School in Long Beach, California. Humphreys was also a member of the Long Beach Admirals and Las Vegas Cowboys of the Continental Football League.

References

External links
Just Sports Stats

1940 births
American football placekickers
Continental Football League players
Denver Broncos (AFL) players
Long Beach City Vikings football players
Living people
Players of American football from Los Angeles
Wichita State Shockers football players
Wichita State University alumni